Ronald Kenneth Hunt (born February 23, 1941) is a former professional baseball second baseman. He played 12 seasons in Major League Baseball from 1963 to 1974 for the New York Mets, Los Angeles Dodgers, San Francisco Giants, Montreal Expos and St. Louis Cardinals. He batted and threw right-handed.

In  Hunt set a single-season record for being hit by more pitches (50) than any player since 1900.

Career
Ron Hunt was born in St. Louis on February 23, 1941. He graduated from Ritenour High School in Breckenridge Hills, Missouri, where he played football and baseball. After graduating, he signed with the Milwaukee Braves, with whom he spent four years in the minor leagues. The Mets purchased his contract in October 1962 and added him to the major league roster.

That year, he also finished runner-up to Pete Rose for the National League Rookie of the Year honors. In  he batted .303 and became the Mets’ first-ever starting All-Star representative, the game being played in Hunt's home ballpark, the newly opened Shea Stadium.

In November 1966 Hunt and Jim Hickman were traded to the Los Angeles Dodgers for Tommy Davis and Derrell Griffith. After batting .263 during the  season, Hunt was traded again, this time to the San Francisco Giants in the same deal that sent Tom Haller to Los Angeles.

In his first season with the Giants , Hunt batted .250 with two home runs. The second came off Bob Gibson the first inning of the Giants' September 17 game against the St. Louis Cardinals and accounted for the only run in Gaylord Perry's no-hitter. 

After two more seasons in San Francisco, Hunt was traded to the Montreal Expos. Late in the  season, the struggling Expos, seeking to turn over their roster, made Hunt the first to go by placing him on waivers. He was claimed by his hometown St. Louis Cardinals, with whom he closed out his career after playing 12 games. The Cardinals brought Hunt to Spring training in 1975, but released him in March, after which he retired.

In his 12-year career Hunt batted .273 with 39 home runs and 370 RBIs in 1483 games played. He was also one of the most difficult batters to strike out, fanning 382 times in 5235 at-bats, or once in every 13.70 at-bats. In 1973, he set an Expos record by only striking out 19 times in 401 at-bats, the fewest ever in franchise history by a player who had at least 400 at-bats on the season.

Hunt hit his last major league home run on September 21, 1971, against the Phillies as a member of the Expos at Jarry Park. He then went 1,302 at-bats and 378 games without hitting another when he closed out his career at the end of the 1974 season.

Hit by pitches
Hunt, whose motto was, “Some people give their bodies to science; I give mine to baseball,” was hit by pitches more often than anyone during his playing days. He led the National League in getting hit by pitches in each of his final seven Major League seasons, and the Major Leagues in all but his final season.

Hunt said in a July 2000 interview with Baseball Digest that he really began to get hit by pitches after being traded to San Francisco. "But," Hunt asked, "why would you hit me to face Willie Mays, Willie McCovey and Jim Ray Hart?" 

In , as a member of the Montreal Expos, he set a single-season record for being hit by more pitches (50) than any player since 1900 (Hughie Jennings holds first place, with 51 hit by pitches in 1896). Hunt, who batted right-handed, would stand with his "left arm hanging over the plate" and allow himself to be hit to make up for his lack of hitting power. On June 25, he was hit three times during a doubleheader. He had the habit of tossing back the ball that had hit him to the pitcher.

On September 29, 1971, against the Chicago Cubs at Jarry Park, Hunt was hit by a Milt Pappas pitch to give him 50 on the season, obliterating the post-1900 record of 31 by Steve Evans. Pappas argued to home plate umpire Ken Burkhart that the pitch was directly over the plate, that Hunt got hit by the ball without even trying to get out of the way. Earlier in the year, Pappas had also contributed #27 in the Hunt collection, prompting Cub manager Leo Durocher to cry foul after home plate umpire Augie Donatelli awarded Hunt first base on that pitch. Cincinnati Reds manager Sparky Anderson had a similar complaint after Hunt was hit by a Jim McGlothlin pitch on August 7 of that year; the HBP was Hunt's 32nd of the season, which broke the National League record set by Steve Evans of the  St. Louis Cardinals.

On April 29, Hunt tied a Major League record with three HBPs in a game against the Cincinnati Reds. At the time, he was only the fifth player to be hit by a pitch three times in one game. The feat has since been done 17 times as of the end of the 2013 season.

Upon his retirement, his 243 HBPs were a post-dead-ball era career record. Hughie Jennings holds the all-time record with 287.

Personal life
Beginning in 1986, Hunt has operated an instructional baseball camp in Wentzville, Missouri. As of 2018, Hunt was reportedly suffering from Parkinson’s disease.

References

External links

Ron Hunt at Baseball Almanac
Ron Hunt - Baseballbiography.com
Ron Hunt's instructional baseball camp
The man who got hit by pitches ESPN, February 10, 2015

1941 births
Living people
American expatriate baseball players in Canada
Austin Senators players
Baseball players from St. Louis
Cedar Rapids Braves players
Florida Instructional League Mets players
Los Angeles Dodgers players
Major League Baseball second basemen
McCook Braves players
Montreal Expos players
National League All-Stars
New York Mets players
People from Wentzville, Missouri
San Francisco Giants players
St. Louis Cardinals players